Tim Paumgartner (born 5 March 2005) is an Austrian professional footballer who plays for FC Liefering.

Club career 
Tim Paumgartner made his professional debut for FC Liefering on the 15 October 2021, replacing Justin Omoregie during a 2–0 home 2. Liga win against Juniors OÖ.

While playing for Liefering in Austria second tier – as their youngest player that season – Paumgartner was a regular starter for FC Salzburg's under-19, notably for their Youth League campaign, as they topped their group stage.

References

External links

OFB profile

2005 births
Living people
Austrian footballers
Austria youth international footballers
Association football midfielders
Footballers from Salzburg
FC Liefering players
2. Liga (Austria) players